Qeshlaq-e Musa Beyg (also Romanized as Qeshlāq-e Mūsá Beyg; also known as Qeshlāq-e Mūsá Beyglū) is a village in Tirchai Rural District, Kandovan District, Meyaneh County, East Azerbaijan Province, Iran. At the 2006 census, its population was 288, in 63 families.

References 

Populated places in Meyaneh County